Zalaegerszeg is a district in northern part of Zala County. Zalaegerszeg is also the name of the town where the district seat is found. The district is located in the Western Transdanubia Statistical Region.

Geography 
Zalaegerszeg District borders with Vasvár District (Vas County) to the north, Zalaszentgrót District to the northeast, Keszthely District to the east, Nagykanizsa District and Letenye District to the south, Lenti District to the west, Körmend District (Vas County) to the northwest. The number of the inhabited places in Zalaegerszeg District is 84.

Municipalities 
The district has 1 urban county, 2 towns and 81 villages.
(ordered by population, as of 1 January 2013)

The bolded municipalities are cities.

See also
List of cities and towns in Hungary

References

External links
 Postal codes of the Zalaegerszeg District

Districts in Zala County